Psorophora columbiae, known generally as the dark ricefield mosquito or glades mosquito, is a species of mosquito in the family Culicidae. They can be found in North America, primarily in the southern United States, such as Arkansas, Louisiana, and Texas.

References

External links

 

Aedini
Articles created by Qbugbot
Insects described in 1906